Katsuk Peak, elevation , is in North Cascades National Park in the U.S. state of Washington. Katsuk Peak is a summit along a ridge known as Jagged Edge. Katsuk Glacier is on the north slopes of the peak. Katsuk Peak is separated from Mesahchie Peak by a distance of only .

References

External links
 Mesahchie and Katsuk aerial photo: PBase

Mountains of Washington (state)
North Cascades National Park
Mountains of Skagit County, Washington